Kramgoa låtar 1998 was released in 1998 as CD and cassette tape and is a Vikingarna studio album. It sold platinum in both Sweden and Norway, and sold totally 175 000 copies.

Track listing

Side A
Kan man älska nå'n på avstånd
Skogsstjärna
One Night with You
Kom till mej
Lika blå som dina ögon
En gammaldags låt
När det regnar

Side B
En söndag i April
Galen i dig
Små små ord
Min sång om kärleken
Änglasjäl
Treat Me Nice
Jag saknar dig

Charts

References 

1998 albums
Vikingarna (band) albums
Swedish-language albums